Lily Augusta Long (1862 - 1927) was an American poet and novelist.

Early life
Long was born in 1862 in St. Paul, Minnesota. She decided to become a writer when she was 11 years old while her family was living in Oregon. After moving back to St. Paul with her parents, she graduated high school and later took an elective course at the University of Wisconsin. As a student, she submitted verses and sketches to local papers. A few of her poems were published in Unity. In 1887, two of her stories appeared in the magazine Overland and Current. Long edited and contributed to Women's Record.

Career
Long wrote short stories and poems for Harper's Weekly. Under the pseudonym Roman Doubleday, she wrote pulp mysteries for The Popular Magazine and novels. In a review from The Brooklyn Daily Eagle of The Hemlock Avenue Mystery, F. Dana Reid wrote, "Roman Doubleday's new story, The Hemlock Avenue Mystery presents and excellent example of a skillfully constructed mystery romance, where the denouement is so successfully concealed that the reader will have no solution of the puzzle before the time arrives for the revealing flash of the limelight". A review in The Boston Globe said, "Roman Doubleday has the ability to crate character, a talent that adds greatly to this kind of fiction".

Death
Long died on September 27, 1927, in St. Paul.

References

1862 births
1927 deaths
American women poets
American women novelists
19th-century American poets
19th-century American novelists
19th-century American women writers
20th-century American poets
20th-century American novelists
20th-century American women writers
19th-century American short story writers
20th-century American short story writers
American women short story writers
Writers from Saint Paul, Minnesota
Poets from Minnesota
Novelists from Minnesota
American mystery novelists
Women mystery writers